

This is a list of the Pennsylvania state historical markers in Lancaster County.

This is intended to be a complete list of the official state historical markers placed in Lancaster County, Pennsylvania by the Pennsylvania Historical and Museum Commission (PHMC). The locations of the historical markers, as well as the latitude and longitude coordinates as provided by the PHMC's database, are included below when available. There are 81 historical markers located in Lancaster County.

Historical markers

See also

List of Pennsylvania state historical markers
National Register of Historic Places listings in Lancaster County, Pennsylvania Listings outside the city of Lancaster
National Register of Historic Places listings in Lancaster, Pennsylvania Lancaster city only

References

External links
Pennsylvania Historical Marker Program
Pennsylvania Historical & Museum Commission

Lancaster County
Tourist attractions in Lancaster County, Pennsylvania